Heythrop Zoological Gardens is a private zoo and animal training centre in Heythrop, near Chipping Norton, Oxfordshire.  The zoo has the largest private collection of exotic animals in the United Kingdom.  The site also houses Amazing Animals, an animal training company that provides exotic animals for the film industry.  The company provides the majority of "zoo-type" animals for British film sets.

Zoo 
Construction of Heythrop Zoological Gardens began in 1990 at a site close to Heythrop Park in Heythrop, near Chipping Norton, Oxfordshire.  The zoo states it was inspired architecturally by London Zoo, but built to modern animal welfare standards.  The zoo planned an expansion in 2017 to add a new lion enclosure and a residential house, these were rejected due to their visual impact on the surrounding countryside.  In 2018 the zoo had seven lions, five tigers, six leopards, two brown bears, six wolves, nine camels, four zebras, two pygmy hippos, ten antelope, eight monkeys, four kangaroos, four crocodiles, three alligators, two Cuvier's dwarf caiman, two bearded lizards, two cobras and a gila monster.  It is the largest private collection of exotic animals in the country.

The zoo is generally private but since 2007 the zoo has run a limited number of open days where the general public is admitted to view the animals and meet their trainers, currently it is open on three days each year.  The zoo also runs animal encounter visits, "zookeeper for a day" experiences and animal training courses.  The site also hosts parties and sends animals on visits to colleges and care homes.  On the decision to remain private co-owner Jim Clubb has said "because of the dynamic of Heythrop Zoological Gardens, we chose not to become a public zoo. We are first and foremost an animal training centre".

Amazing Animals 

The zoo also houses Amazing Animals, a company run by Jim and Sally Clubb that hires out trained animals for films, television and private events.  The company claims that the zoo location is the largest private zoo in Europe specifically built to meet the needs of film and television production.  It is the largest trainer and supplier of animals to the UK film and television industry; and most zoo-type animals that appear on film sets in the UK are provided by the company.  As well as providing animals, the company has its own studio space on site with greenscreen capabilities and around half of its work is carried out there.

Amazing Animals has provided animals for Holmes & Watson, The Legend of Tarzan and Doctor Who.  Animal rights groups have called for a ban on the use of animals for film and television. Naturalist Chris Packham has specifically criticised Amazing Animals.  Heythrop Zoological Gardens state that they maintain high standards of animal welfare and have been "actively consulted with the creation of several pieces of animal legislation as well as educational initiatives in animal welfare and training".

In February 2019, two of the male penguins used by the company were "married" in a ceremony held at a wedding venue near the zoo.  The pair, named Ferrari and Pringle, nest together each year, attempting to hatch a rock instead of an egg.  The penguins have appeared on The Jonathan Ross Show, Alan Carr: Chatty Man, in the television series Our Zoo and at the red carpet premiere of the film Mr. Popper's Penguins.

Amazing Animals provided five penguins for the opening of an Ice Festival at the Liverpool One shopping complex in November 2012, where they were placed on an ice rink.  The event was criticised by PETA as the animals would not encounter ice in their natural habitat, the shores of Peru and Chile.  A vet from the Heythrop Zoo stated "at no time have the penguins exhibited any distress in their surroundings".

References 

Zoos in England
Buildings and structures in Oxfordshire
Animal training